Yang Berbahagia Datin Paduka Shuhaimi Baba (born 27 January 1967), is a Malaysian film director. She was born in Negeri Sembilan.

Filmography

Film

Television

Honours
  :
  Knight Companion of the Order of Sultan Sharafuddin Idris Shah (DSIS) – Datin Paduka (2008)

Awards and nominations
 Special Jury Award (Layar Lara) 6th Pyongyang International Film Festival in North Korea, 1998
 Best Director for Foreign Film (Layar Lara) Brussels International Independent Film Festival in Belgium, 1997
 Best Film (Layar Lara) 13th Malaysia Film Festival, 1997
 Best Director (Layar Lara) 13th Malaysia Film Festival, 1997

References

External links
Biodata

Living people
Malay-language film directors
Malaysian film directors
Malaysian Muslims
Malaysian people of Malay descent
Malaysian screenwriters
Malaysian women film directors
People from Negeri Sembilan
1967 births